Salvador Corelo is a Honduran swimmer. He competed in five events at the 1984 Summer Olympics.

References

Year of birth missing (living people)
Living people
Honduran male swimmers
Olympic swimmers of Honduras
Swimmers at the 1984 Summer Olympics
Place of birth missing (living people)
20th-century Honduran people